Susan York (born 1951) is an American artist and educator, primarily known for her reductive cast graphite sculpture. She lives and works in Santa Fe, New Mexico where the quality of light and expansive emptiness of the high desert landscape provides inspiration.

Early life and education
York was born in Newport, Rhode Island.

In 1972, she received a BFA in studio arts from the University of New Mexico in Albuquerque. In 1995, she received an MFA in ceramics from Cranbrook Academy of Art. While in college, York created a body of floor-oriented assemblage work. These flat reductive works marked transitions between 2D and 3D materials.

Career
After graduating from UNM, York continued her art practice in Santa Fe, where she had a studio space at a local Zen Center. In 1982, Yosherk attended an Agnes Martin lecture, where she recalls the impact of Martin's statement: "My paintings are not about what is seen. They are about what is known forever in the mind." This was a pivotal experience and later a mentoring friendship evolved between York and Martin.

In 1997, as an artist in residence at the European Ceramic Work Center, in the Netherlands, York began to experiment with integrating her forms within the rooms of a given space. This led to compositions of stacked fragile porcelain shards positioned next to objects blackened with graphite powder rubbed surfaces. York's sculptures are associated with principles of Minimalism with traces of a repetitive hands-on process. Susan York exhibits her work in New York and Europe.

Public collections
 Brooklyn Museum, Brooklyn, NY
 Lannan Foundation, Marfa, TX and Santa Fe, NM
 Museum of Fine Arts of New Mexico, Santa Fe, NM
 Museum für Konkrete Kunst, Ingolstadt, Germany
 The Maxine & Stuart Frankel Foundation for Art, Bloomfield Hills, MI
 Yale University, Beinecke Library, New Haven, CT

Works and publications

References

External links
 
 Susan York at Lannan Foundation

Living people
1951 births
20th-century American sculptors
21st-century American sculptors
20th-century American women artists
21st-century American women artists
University of New Mexico alumni
Cranbrook Academy of Art alumni
People from Newport County, Rhode Island
American ceramists
American women ceramists
American women sculptors
Minimalist artists
American conceptual artists
American installation artists
Contemporary sculptors